Sir Charles Alfred Bell  (October 31, 1870 – March 8, 1945) was the British Political Officer for Bhutan, Sikkim and Tibet. He was known as "British India's ambassador to Tibet" before retiring and becoming a noted tibetologist.

Biography 
He was educated at Winchester College, and then at New College, Oxford, after which he joined the Indian Civil Service in 1891.

In 1908, he was appointed Political Officer in Sikkim. He soon became very influential in Sikkimese and Bhutanese politics, and in 1910 he met the 13th Dalai Lama, who had been forced into temporary exile by the Chinese. He got to know him quite well, and later wrote his biography (Portrait of the Dalai Lama, published in 1946).

In 1913 he participated in the Simla Convention, a treaty between Great Britain, China and Tibet concerning the status of Tibet. Before the summit, he met in Gyantse with Paljor Dorje Shatra, the Tibetan representative to the British Raj at Darjeeling and advised him to bring to Simla with him all documents concerning relations between China and Tibet, as well as Tibetan claims to land occupied by China. Bell was designated to assist the Tibetans in the negotiations, with Archibald Rose assigned to be his counterpart for the Chinese. He was appointed a Companion of the Order of St Michael and St George (CMG) in the 1915 New Year Honours for his services.

In 1919 he resigned as Britain's political officer in Sikkim to devote himself full-time to his research. However, London sent him to Lhasa in 1920 as a special ambassador.

After travelling through Tibet and visiting Lhasa in 1920, he retired to Oxford, where he wrote a series of books on the history, culture and religion of Tibet. He was awarded a knighthood for his Lhasa Mission in 1922.

Palhese, Bell's Tibetan friend and confidant travelled to England in 1927-28 to assist him in editing several of these books.

Some of the photographs that he took in Tibet can be found in the Pitt Rivers Museum in Oxford. Some of these were included in the 1997 book Tibet: Caught in Time.

His English-Tibetan colloquial dictionary was first published in 1905 together with a grammar of colloquial Tibetan as Manual of Colloquial Tibetan.

Peter Fleming mentions Bell in the introduction to the book Seven Years in Tibet by Heinrich Harrer, Flamingo imprint 1997, specifically his surprisingly close relationship to the 13th Dalai Lama even though he was a foreigner.

References

Works 
Manual of Colloquial Tibetan. Calcutta: Baptist Mission Press, 1905. (Part II, English-Tibetan vocabulary; later editions 1919 and 1939)
Portrait of a Dalai Lama: the Life and Times of the Great Thirteenth by Charles Alfred Bell, Sir Charles Bell, Publisher: Wisdom Publications (MA), January 1987,  (first published as Portrait of the Dalai Lama: London: Collins, 1946).
Tibet: Past and Present. Oxford: Clarendon Press, 1924
The People of Tibet. Oxford: Clarendon Press, 1928
The Religion of Tibet. Oxford: Clarendon Press, 1931
Tibet: Caught in Time. Reading: Garnet, 1997. Contains photographs by Charles Bell and John Claude White

External links 
the Tibet Album, British photography in Central Tibet 1920 - 1950
List of illustrations from 'The People of Tibet', Sir Charles Bell, Oxford: Clarendon Press, 1928
Photo

Tibetologists
1870 births
1945 deaths
Ambassadors to Tibet
Companions of the Order of St Michael and St George
Knights Commander of the Order of the Indian Empire
People educated at Winchester College
Alumni of New College, Oxford
British people in colonial India